Ceredig ap Cunedda (died 453), was king of Ceredigion in Wales.

He may have been born c. 420 in the Brythonic kingdom of Manaw Gododdin (modern Lothian in Scotland), centred on the Firth of Forth in the area known as Yr Hen Ogledd.
Little is known of him. One of the sons of Cunedda, grandfather of Saint David, according to Nennius' Historia Brittonum, he arrived in what is now modern Wales from Gododdin with his father's family when they were invited to help ward off Irish invaders. As a reward for his bravery, his father gave him the southernmost part of the territories in north-west Wales reconquered from the Irish. The realm is traditionally supposed to have been called Ceredigion after him, which led to the name of modern Ceredigion, one of the principal areas of Wales.

He married Meleri, one of the many daughters of King Brychan Brycheiniog of Brycheiniog (now Brecknockshire). Amongst their children was a daughter named Ina who is thought to be the Saint Ina to whom St Ina's Church in Llanina near New Quay, Ceredigion is dedicated.

Footnotes

References 
 Lives of the Cambro British saints, William Jenkins Rees, Thomas Wakeman, 1835
 A history of Wales from the earliest times, John Edward Lloyd, 1911
 The Cambrian, A Bi-Monthly Published in the interest of the Welsh people and their descendants in the United States, 1881, Vol. 1, 1881

420s births
British traditional history
Britons of the North
Monarchs of Ceredigion
People from Clackmannanshire
5th-century monarchs in Europe
453 deaths